Anatrichosomatidae is a family of nematodes belonging to the order Trichocephalida.

Genera:
 Anatrichosoma Smith & Chitwood, 1954

References

Nematodes